Yarınsız Adam is a Turkish political film by Remzi Aydın Jöntürk, the first in his trilogy. It was succeeded by Satılmış Adam (Sold Man) and Yıkılmayan Adam (Indestructible Man), both filmed in 1977. The film is about the story of Murat, portrayed by Cüneyt Arkın. Murat helps his friend, Kemal, when they are escaping from the police because they steal to survive. This help costs Murat badly and he is sent to prison. During the runtime of the film, viewers see the world from the eyes of a criminal, who lived his childhood in poverty, and understand the gap between the rich and poor in Turkey.

Just like the themes of the other political films of Jöntürk, there is a socialist message, an attribution to the inequality of the system. Jöntürk prefers to do it rather sharply in some scenes of the film. For example, the poor little boy that gets in the car of Murat directly states that the rich and the poor can't be friends because wealthy people can't understand the feelings of poor people.

Cast 
 Cüneyt Arkın ... Murat Demir
 Levent İnanır ... young Murat 
 Betül Aşçıoğlu ... Zeliş
 Bilal İnci ... Baba
 Macit Flordun ... Kemal
 Ömer Kahraman ... young Kemal
 Orhan Alkan ... Danışman
 İhsan Baysal ... Murat's driver Kemal
 Yüksel Gözen ... Akif Danaoğlu
 Mine Sun ... Kemal's wife
 Kahraman Kral ... Ferhat
 Yusuf Çetin ...

Characters 
 Murat - a man who gained success in the criminal world, without wanting to be a part of it.
 Kemal - Murat's childhood friend who later becomes the primary school teacher of their town.
 Zeliş - Murat's sister. Later becomes a prostitute because she can't find another job.
 Baba - a mafia leader who meets with young Murat in prison. He wants to gain his old power with the help of him.
 Danışman - business advisor of Baba, who later betrays Murat.

References

External links 
 Listing at Sinematurk
 
 
 

1976 films
1970s Turkish-language films
Turkish independent films
Films set in Turkey
Gangster films
Films about poverty
Turkish action films
Political action films
Turkish vigilante films
Films about organized crime in Turkey
1970s crime action films
1970s vigilante films
Courtroom films